Emmanouil "Manolis" Papadopoulos (was a Greek water polo player. He competed in the 1948 Summer Olympics. At club level, he played for Olympiacos.

References

External links
  

Date of birth missing
Possibly living people
Greek male water polo players
Olympic water polo players of Greece
Water polo players at the 1948 Summer Olympics
Olympiacos Water Polo Club players
Place of birth missing